Seymchan may refer to:
Seymchan (urban-type settlement), an urban-type settlement in Magadan Oblast, Russia
Seymchan (Kolyma), a tributary of the Kolyma
Seymchan Airport, an airport in Magadan Oblast
Seymchan (meteorite), a meteorite found in 1967 in Russia